The Bells Comprehensive Secondary School for Boys and Girls is a secondary school located in Ota, Ogun State, Nigeria. The school educates about 500-1000 students.

References

External links 

Boarding schools in Nigeria
Secondary schools in Ogun State
1991 establishments in Nigeria